Alphamenes is a small neotropical genus of potter wasps currently containing 7 species, it was named by the Dutch entomologist Jacobus van der Vecht in 1977.

References

 Giordani Soika, A. 1978. Revisione degli Eumenidi neotropicali appartenenti ai generi Eumenes Latr., Omicron (Sauss.), Pararaphidoglossa  Schulth. ed affini. Boll. Mus. Civ. Stor. Nat. Venezia 29: 1–420.

Potter wasps
Hymenoptera genera